The 2016 Nelson mayoral election was part of the New Zealand local elections that were held on 8 October 2016 to elect the Mayor of Nelson, New Zealand.

Results

References

2016 elections in New Zealand
Mayoral elections in New Zealand
Politics of Nelson, New Zealand